District 11 of Georgia State Senate is located in Bainbridge. Its current representative is Dean Burke.

District office holder
 John Bulloch January, 2003 – December 6, 2012 – Republican
 Dean Burke February 11, 2013 – Present – Republican

References
 http://www.senate.ga.gov/senators/en-US/district.aspx?District=11&Session=27

Government of Georgia (U.S. state)
Georgia Senate districts